Dana Vernon Ashbrook (born May 24, 1967) is an American actor, best known for playing Bobby Briggs on the television series Twin Peaks (1990–1991, 2017) and its 1992 prequel film Twin Peaks: Fire Walk with Me.

Early life
Ashbrook was born in San Diego, California; his mother, D'Ann (née Paton) is a teacher and his father, Vernon L. "Buddy" Ashbrook, was a director of the Palomar College drama department. He is the brother of writer Taylor Ashbrook and actress Daphne Ashbrook.

Career
In 1978, Ashbrook made his film debut in an uncredited role in Attack of the Killer Tomatoes! A decade later, after an acting hiatus, Ashbrook guest starred on the television series Cagney & Lacey, Knots Landing, and ABC Afterschool Special before starring as Tom Essex in the 1988 horror film Return of the Living Dead Part II. The same year, he starred in the horror film Waxwork alongside Deborah Foreman and guest starred on an episode of 21 Jump Street.

In 1989, Ashbrook portrayed Joey in She's Out of Control. From 1990-1991, Ashbrook played Bobby Briggs on the cult TV series Twin Peaks. While starring on Twin Peaks, Ashbrook appeared in the films Sundown: The Vampire in Retreat (1990), Ghost Dad (1990), Girlfriend from Hell (1990), and The Willies (1990) as well as on an episode of the television series The Hidden Room.

In 1992, Ashbrook reprised his role as Bobby Briggs in the prequel film Twin Peaks: Fire Walk with Me and portrayed Clyde Barrow in the television film Bonnie & Clyde: The True Story alongside Tracey Needham. In 1994, Ashbrook appeared in the short film The Coriolis Effect (alongside Jennifer Rubin and Quentin Tarantino) and in the film Cityscrapes: Los Angeles. He acted in the 1995 science fiction television pilot W.E.I.R.D. World, written and produced by the makers of the Tales from the Crypt series.

In 1995, Ashbrook starred in the film Comfortably Numb. In 1996, Ashbrook guest starred on the television series The Outer Limits. The following year, Ashbrook was cast as Gary McDermott on the short-lived television series Crisis Center. In 1998, he portrayed Seth in the film Interstate 5 and guest starred on the television series Welcome to Paradox.

Ashbrook has appeared on The WB's Charmed in the 2001 episode "Just Harried", on NBC's The Pretender in the 2000 episode "Rules of Engagement", on The Outer Limits in the 1996 episode "Resurrection", and on Law & Order: Special Victims Unit in the 2007 episode "Haystack". Ashbook played the recurring role of Rich Rinaldi on the television series Dawson's Creek (2002–2003). In 2009, Ashbrook joined the cast of the series Crash for the regular part of Jimmy. In 2010, he reunited with some of the cast of Twin Peaks on the comedy-tribute episode of Psych, titled "Dual Spires". In 2012, Ashbrook starred alongside Ray Wise and Derek Mears in the Steven C. Miller psycho-thriller The Aggression Scale. In 2014, he appeared in the werewolf horror film Late Phases.

In 2017, Ashbrook reprised his role as Bobby Briggs in David Lynch's revival series Twin Peaks: The Return.

Personal life
Ashbrook married actress Kate Rogal on August 15, 2015 in a private ceremony in Pittsburgh, Pennsylvania.

Filmography

Film

Television

References

External links

American male child actors
American male film actors
American male stage actors
American male television actors
Male actors from San Diego
1967 births
Living people